Sandline International was a private military company (PMC) based in London, established in the early 1990s. It was involved in conflicts in Papua New Guinea in 1997 and had a contract with the government under  then-Prime Minister Julius Chan, causing the Sandline affair. In 1998 in Sierra Leone Sandline had a contract with ousted President Kabbah  and in Liberia in 2003 was involved in a rebel attempt to evict the then-president Charles Taylor near the end of the civil war. Sandline ceased all operations on 16 April 2004.
 
On the company's website, a reason for closure is given:

Sandline was founded and managed by retired British Army Lieutenant Colonel Tim Spicer. Sandline billed itself as a PMC and offered military training, "operational support" such as equipment and arms procurement and limited direct military activity, intelligence gathering, and public relations services to governments and corporations. While the mass media often referred to Sandline as a mercenary company, the company's founders disputed that characterisation.  A commercial adviser for Sandline once told the BBC that the firm saw themselves differently from mercenaries, stating that they were an established entity with “established sets of principles” and that they employed professional people. He reiterated that the firm would not accept contracts from groups or governments that would jeopardise its reputation.

Spicer recounted his experiences with Sandline in the book An Unorthodox Soldier.

See also
Aegis Defence Services
Executive Outcomes
Simon Mann

Bibliography

References

External links
 
 
 

Private military contractors
Mercenary units and formations
History of Papua New Guinea
History of Sierra Leone
History of Liberia